Various unknown astronomical objects have been hypothesized throughout recorded history. For example, in the 5th century BCE, the philosopher Philolaus defined a hypothetical astronomical object which he called the "Central Fire", around which he proposed other celestial bodies (including the Sun) moved.

Types of hypothetical astronomical objects
Hypothetical astronomical objects have been speculated to exist both inside and outside of the Solar System, and speculation has included different kinds of stars, planets, and other astronomical objects.
 For hypothetical astronomical objects in the Solar System, see: List of hypothetical Solar System objects
 For hypothetical stars, see: Hypothetical star
 For hypothetical brown dwarfs, see: List of brown dwarfs
 For hypothetical black holes, see: Hypothetical black hole
 For extrasolar moons, all of which are currently hypothetical, see: Extrasolar moon
 For stars, planets or moons whose existence is not accepted by science, see: Planetary objects proposed in religion, astrology, ufology and pseudoscience and Stars proposed in religion
 For hypothetical planets in fiction, see: Fictional planets of the Solar System

Hypothetical planet types
Hypothetical types of extrasolar planets include:

References

Astronomy